Hans Wertinger (c. 1465 – 1533), was a German painter.

Biography
He was born in Landshut and worked in Munich. He is known for portraits which he finished with decorative hanging garlands at the top.
He died in Landshut.

Works 
 King Alexander and his physician Philip, National Gallery in Prague

References

Literature 
 Jaroslav Pešina, German Painting of the 15th and 16th Centuries, Artia Praha 1962

Hans Wertinger on Artnet

1465 births
1533 deaths
German painters
German male painters
People from Landshut